New Vision Television was a broadcast company based in Santa Monica, California. Throughout its two decade plus history, the company owned or managed over 60 television stations in large and medium-sized markets.

History

New Vision I
Formed by Jason Elkin in 1993 in Atlanta, GA, New Vision Television began its ownership in local television by acquiring the assets of News-Press & Gazette Company in December 1993 for $110 million. The deal included television stations in Jackson, MS (WJTV, including semi-satellite WHLT in Hattiesburg); Wilmington, NC (WECT), Savannah, GA (WSAV-TV), Sioux Falls, SD (KSFY and satellites KABY and KPRY), and Tucson, Arizona (KOLD). New Vision I sold its assets to Bert Ellis and Ellis Communications in 1995 for $230 million. (Most of them initially went to Raycom Media, but some had to be traded to Media General and KSFY was sold to Hoak Media.)

New Vision II
New Vision Television CEO Jason Elkin and COO John Heinen started a new company, New Vision Television II, that capitalized with $200 million and owned a maximum of four network affiliates. (Elkin had bought the stations from NPG that were sold to Ellis.) New Vision II owned KSBY in Santa Barbara, California; KVII-TV in Amarillo, Texas; WISE-TV in Fort Wayne, Indiana; and KDLH in Duluth, Minnesota. In 2005, New Vision II sold all of its stations at the time to Cordillera Communications, Barrington Broadcasting, and Granite Broadcasting.

New Vision III
New Vision III was a restart of the company with new stations. On August 1, 2006, New Vision announced an agreement to acquire CBS affiliates WIAT in Birmingham, Alabama and KIMT in Mason City, Iowa from Media General for $35 million. The acquisition was finalized on October 12 of that year. On November 15, New Vision announced an agreement to acquire CBS affiliate WKBN-TV and sister Fox affiliate WYFX-LP in Youngstown, Ohio for undisclosed terms, and signed a shared services agreement to operate Youngstown ABC affiliate WYTV for owner Parkin Broadcasting (later named PBC Broadcasting). New Vision subsequently launched the My Valley branding for several services offered by WKBN, WYFX, and WYTV. In September 2007, New Vision acquired Savannah, Georgia ABC affiliate WJCL-TV from Piedmont Television; in November, it acquired all of the assets of Montecito Broadcasting: KOIN-TV in Portland, Oregon; KHON-TV in Honolulu, Hawaii and satellites; KSNW-TV in Wichita, Kansas and satellites; and (in a related stock transaction) KSNT-TV in Topeka, Kansas. In 2008, New Vision bought KTMJ-CA and repeaters in Topeka (co-managed with KSNT) and announced plans to convert KBNZ-LD in Bend, Oregon (which has since been sold) from a translator of KOIN to its own station.

In 2009, New Vision Television received a $28 million line of credit during its bankruptcy proceedings. New Vision, doing business as NV Broadcasting, filed for Chapter 11 after reaching an agreement with first- and second-lien debt holders that converts $400 million in debt to equity in the reorganized company.

On May 7, 2012, LIN Media acquired the 13 television stations owned by New Vision Television. The sale provided a significant gain in equity for New Vision’s investors. The sales agreement included operational control of the three PBC Broadcasting-owned stations (KTKA, WTGS and WYTV) involved in shared service agreements with New Vision-owned stations in Topeka, Savannah and Youngstown (the licenses of the PBC stations are being transferred to Vaughan Media as part of the deal). The FCC approved the deal on October 2, 2012, and was completed on October 12, 2012. LIN was itself absorbed by Media General in late 2014; Media General would then be absorbed to Nexstar Media Group in 2017.

New Vision IV
In late 2014 New Vision founder Jason Elkin formed New Vision IV. Based in Santa Monica, California New Vision IV is currently looking for middle and major network affiliate acquisitions. New Vision IV is a part of the New Vision Group

Former New Vision-owned stations
Stations are arranged in alphabetical order by state and city of license.

Note:
1 Owned by PBC Broadcasting, LLC, New Vision operated these stations through shared services agreements.

References

External links
Investment information

Mass media companies established in 1993
Mass media companies disestablished in 2012
Defunct television broadcasting companies of the United States
Companies that filed for Chapter 11 bankruptcy in 2009
2012 mergers and acquisitions
Nexstar Media Group
Defunct companies based in Greater Los Angeles